Glenea changchini is a species of beetle in the family Cerambycidae. It was described by Lin and Lin in 2011. It is known from Vietnam and China.

References

changchini
Beetles described in 2011